Vincent Lambe (born 1 December 1980, Dublin) is an Irish film director, screenwriter and producer. Lambe received acclaim for directing the 2018 short film Detainment, which is about the murder of James Bulger. The film earned him a 2019 Academy Award nomination.

Lambe is a graduate of the National Film School, at the Dún Laoghaire Institute of Art, Design and Technology.

Filmography 
  After the War (1999, short film)
   Sacred  (2000, short film)
 Broken Things (2002, short film)
 Detainment (2018, short film)

Awards and nominations
1999
  After the War   
 Fresh Film Festival: Short Film  – won 
2003
  Broken Things 
 Woods Hole Film Festival: Best Short / Drama  – won 
 Dublin Film and Music Fleadh:  Best Short Drama, Most Promising Director		 –  won 

2018
 Detainment
 Winchester Film Festival: Best Foreign Short Film – won 
 Odense International Film Festival: Best International Film, HCA Award	 – won 
 Richard Harris International Film Festival: Best Director,Best Overall Short Film		 – won 
 Krakow Film Festival: Don Quixote Award			 – won 
 Kerry Film Festival: Best Short Film – won 
 Irish Screen America: Rising Star Award – won
 Cannes Lions International Festival of Creativity: Best Short Film,  Special Jury Award – won
2019
 Detainment
 Oscar:  Best Live Action Short Film	 – nom
 Clermont-Ferrand International Short Film Festival:  Grand Prix	 –  nom

References

External links 
 
 

1980 births
Living people
Irish film directors
Irish screenwriters
Irish film producers
Film people from Dublin (city)
Irish male screenwriters
Alumni of IADT